Arizona v. Inter Tribal Council of Arizona, Inc., 570 U.S. 1 (2013), is a 2012-term United States Supreme Court case revolving around Arizona's unique voter registration requirements, including the necessity of providing documentary proof of citizenship. In a 7–2 decision, the Supreme Court held that Arizona's registration requirements were unlawful because they were preempted by federal voting laws.

Background
The Arizona voter registration requirements arose from a 2004 Arizona proposition, Arizona Proposition 200 (2004), which was a ballot initiative designed in part "to combat voter fraud by requiring voters to present proof of citizenship when they register to vote and to present identification when they vote on election day." The state law requires, besides other things, persons to provide proof of citizenship to register to vote, and requires voter-registration officials to "reject" any application for registration, including a Federal Form under the National Voter Registration Act of 1993, that is not accompanied by documentary evidence of citizenship.

A group of Arizona residents and a group of nonprofit organizations challenged the Arizona law in court. The District Court of Arizona granted Arizona summary judgment on the respondents' claim that the federal Act preempts Arizona's requirement. In October 2010, the Ninth Circuit Court reversed, holding that the state's requirement of documentary proof of citizenship is invalid as being preempted by the registration provision in the federal NVRA, at least when an applicant uses the National Mail Voter Registration Form (the "Federal Form") to register to vote in federal elections, and that the requirement to provide voter identification at the polling place is valid.

However, in April 2011, the court granted Arizona's petition for en banc review of this ruling, and it heard oral arguments on June 21, 2011. In April 2012, the en banc court also held that the requirement to provide proof of citizenship to register to vote is invalid as preempted by the NVRA and that the requirement to provide voter identification at the polling place is valid.  The Supreme Court of the United States declined to stay the ruling on June 28, 2012. In July 2012, Arizona petitioned the Supreme Court for a writ of certiorari to review the Ninth Circuit's ruling. The Supreme Court granted the petition in October 2012, and it heard oral arguments on March 18, 2013.

Opinion of the Court
On June 17, 2013, the Supreme Court ruled against Arizona in a 7–2 decision, which struck down the state law. Justice Scalia wrote the majority opinion, confirming the Ninth Circuit's rulings and holding that the state requirements relating to voter registrations were pre-empted by the federal NVRA law, which mandates states to "accept and use" the Federal Form. Justices Clarence Thomas and Samuel Alito dissented. However, the Court also suggested ways for Arizona to overcome the hurdle. The 7-2 Decision stated “Arizona is correct that the Elections Clause empowers Congress to regulate how federal elections are held, but not who may vote in them. The latter is the province of the states.”  However, because Attorney General Tom Horne’s predecessor as Attorney General had not appealed an adverse decision by the commission, the case was sent back for a new petition to the commission to be appealed.  It was consolidated with a 10th circuit case, which ruled adversely, and the Supreme Court chose not to review a second time. The Court also held that Arizona may petition to have more requirements added to the federal standard.

See also 
List of United States Supreme Court cases, volume 570

References

External links
 
 Inter Tribal Council of Arizona official web site

United States Supreme Court cases
United States Supreme Court cases of the Roberts Court
2012 in United States case law
History of voting rights in the United States
Native American history of Arizona
Arizona elections
United States elections case law
Legal history of Arizona